Chomsky ("from (Vyoska) /  (nearby Brest, now Belarus)") is a surname of Slavic origin. Notable people with the surname include:

 Alejandro Chomski (born 1968), Argentine film director and screenwriter
 Aviva Chomsky (born 1957), American historian
 Carol (Schatz) Chomsky (1930–2008), American linguist and wife of Noam Chomsky
 Judith Chomsky (born 1942), American human rights lawyer and co-founder of the Juvenile Law Center
 Marvin J. Chomsky (1929–2022), American television and film director
 Noam Chomsky (born 1928), American linguist and political activist, professor emeritus at MIT
  (born 1957), Polish speedway rider and coach
 William Chomsky (1896–1977), American scholar of Hebrew
  (1925–2016), Soviet and Russian theater director

See also 
 Gryf coat of arms
 Odrowąż coat of arms

Slavic-language surnames
Polish-language surnames
Surnames of Polish origin
Polish toponymic surnames
Khomskiy
Ashkenazi surnames
Jewish families
Belarusian Jews